Urška Žolnir (born 9 October 1981) is a Slovenian retired judoka and a politician. She's a member of Judo Club Sankaku Celje.

She won the bronze medal in the half-middleweight (–63 kg) division at the 2004 Summer Olympics and gold medal at the 2012 Olympics in the same division. That makes her the most successful Slovenian judoka of all time.

She was the Slovenian flagbearer at the Beijing 2008 Olympics.

She is a candidate for the Slovenian National Assembly under the Party Povežimo Slovenijo.

References

External links

 
 
 
 
 

 Judo club Sankaku

1981 births
Living people
Slovenian female judoka
Judoka at the 2004 Summer Olympics
Judoka at the 2008 Summer Olympics
Judoka at the 2012 Summer Olympics
Olympic judoka of Slovenia
Olympic bronze medalists for Slovenia
Sportspeople from Celje
Olympic medalists in judo
Olympic gold medalists for Slovenia
Medalists at the 2012 Summer Olympics
Medalists at the 2004 Summer Olympics
Judoka trainers
Mediterranean Games gold medalists for Slovenia
Mediterranean Games bronze medalists for Slovenia
Competitors at the 2005 Mediterranean Games
Competitors at the 2009 Mediterranean Games
Mediterranean Games medalists in judo
21st-century Slovenian women